Gergely István "Greg" Somogyi (born October 1, 1989) is a Hungarian former professional basketball player. He played college basketball at the University of California, Santa Barbara.

Professional career
Following his graduation from UCSB, Somogyi joined the Santa Barbara Breakers for the 2012 WCBL season. On April 16, 2012, he recorded a 30-30 game for the Breakers. With 33 points and 33 rebounds, he led the Breakers to a 108-89 victory over the Hollywood Beach Dawgs.

After going undrafted in the 2012 NBA draft, Somogyi joined the Los Angeles Lakers for the 2012 NBA Summer League. On September 5, 2012, he signed with the Lakers. However, he was waived by the Lakers on October 22, 2012. In December 2012, he signed with Básquet Coruña of Spain for the rest of the 2012–13 season.

In August 2013, Somogyi signed with Alba Fehérvár of Hungary for the 2013–14 season.

In July 2014, Somogyi joined the Utah Jazz for the 2014 NBA Summer League. On October 1, 2014, he signed with Latina Basket of Italy for the 2014–15 season. On November 18, 2014, he parted ways with Latina after appearing in eight games. On December 22, 2014, he signed with Szolnoki Olaj of Hungary for the rest of the season. He returned to Szolnoki for the 2015–16 season after helping the team claim the league championship in 2014–15.

References

External links
Hungarian League Profile
ABA Liga Profile
Eurobasket.com Profile

1989 births
Living people
Alba Fehérvár players
Basketball players from Budapest
Centers (basketball)
Hungarian men's basketball players
Szolnoki Olaj KK players
UC Santa Barbara Gauchos men's basketball players